Cashbox, also known as Cash Box, was an American music industry trade magazine, originally published weekly from July 1942 to November 1996. Ten years after its dissolution, it was revived and continues as Cashbox Magazine, an online magazine with weekly charts and occasional special print issues. In addition to the music industry, the magazine covered the amusement arcade industry, including jukebox machines and arcade games.

History

Print edition charts (1952–1996)
Cashbox was one of several magazines that published record charts in the United States. Its most prominent competitors were Billboard and Record World (known as Music Vendor prior to April 1964). Unlike Billboard, Cashbox combined all currently available recordings of a song into one chart position with artist and label information shown for each version, alphabetized by label. Originally, no indication of which version was the biggest seller was given, but from October 25, 1952, a star was placed next to the names of the most important artists. Cashbox also printed shorter jukebox charts that included specific artist data beginning in spring 1950. Separate charts were presented for jukebox popularity, record sales and radio airplay. This was similar to Billboards methodology prior to August 1958, when Billboard debuted its "Hot 100", which attempted to combine all measures of popularity into one all-encompassing chart. In addition, Cashbox published chart data for specific genres, such as country music and R&B music. In 1960, Cashbox discontinued its R&B chart after the March 5 issue; it was reinstated in the December 17 issue due to popular demand. The chart was originally dropped because it became dominated by pop records.

Cashbox was a competitor to Billboard through the 1950s and 1960s, but two factors spelled its decline in 1970. Archivist and record historian Joel Whitburn published his first research book based on the Billboard Hot 100, which made that data the "Bible" for official historic chart positions. In addition, the syndicated radio series American Top 40 with Casey Kasem used Billboard chart statistics, cementing Billboard as the dominant chart data for current and historic reference. Magazine publisher George Albert compiled Cashbox chart data for a reference book more than a decade later, and Dick Clark used Cashbox information for a time on his National Music Survey, beginning in 1981. However, by that time, the trend was set. 

Perhaps the final straw for Cashbox came on December 12, 1992, when the Top 100 chart reported the number one song as "The Letter" by Wayne Newton. The song did not even make the bottom of any Billboard chart, nor was it reported to be in the top ten by local radio charts or sales reports. This called the magazine's integrity into question. Cashbox lost considerable credibility within the industry after this, with accusations of chart fixing. No official findings of the Newton incident were ever revealed. Cashbox would subsequently print its final consecutive chart of this era in November 1996.

In 2003, the former Cashbox Magazine became involved in a murder trial after police in Nashville, Tennessee, made an arrest in a 1989 cold case. Kevin Hughes was a small-town boy from southeastern Illinois who spent his childhood focused on music and creating his own country music charts. As a young man of 22, Hughes thought he had landed his dream job in Nashville as the chart director for Cashboxs country music chart for up-and-coming artists. He compiled data from jukebox plays, record sales, and radio play to determine the Cashbox chart positions of various country music records. He reportedly was looking to introduce more scientific and transparent methods of determining chart positions, when a year into his job, he was gunned down in the street late one night on Nashville's famous Music Row. After years of investigation, police arrested his former Cashbox coworker, Richard D'Antonio, for the murder. Prosecutors maintained the killing was in connection with a payola scheme where record promoter Chuck Dixon paid Cashbox employees for favorable chart positions and other publicity. A Dixon client was once named Cashboxs "Male Vocalist of the Year" without having sold a single record. Hughes was reportedly killed for not going along with the chart-fixing scheme. D'Antonio, a Cashbox employee associated with Dixon, was convicted of first degree murder in 2003 and died in prison in 2014.  Dixon had already died a few years prior to D'Antonio's arrest.

Online magazine (2006–present)
Cash Box was reinvented as the online-only Cashbox Magazine in 2006, with the consent and cooperation of the family of Albert, the late president and publisher of the original edition. Cashbox has occasionally issued special print editions.

, Cashbox Magazine has added the following music charts: Roots Music, Bluegrass Singles, Bluegrass Gospel Singles, Beach Music Top 40, Roadhouse Blues and Boogie Top 40, Country Christian Top 100 Singles and Southern Gospel Singles. The online magazine also relaunched the Looking Ahead Charts on March 1, 2015, covering all genres of music. The Cashbox Top 100 has been expanded to the Top 200. All chart data for the main Cashbox charts is provided by Digital Radio Tracker.

Sandy Graham is the owner, editor in chief and CEO of Cashbox Canada, an independent music trade in Toronto, Canada. Shane and Robert Bartosh control the Roots data. Bruce Elrod is the owner and remains the registered agent for Cashbox, which is now operated from Ridgeway, South Carolina.

The current owners of Cashbox met with Wilds & Associates co-founder and CEO Randall Wilds in 2018 to discuss business relations. Wilds acquired interest in Cashbox Magazine and a partnership was formed. As a result, Wilds & Associates became the publisher for Cashbox. While the digital/online edition remains intact, Cashbox returned to a printed edition as a bi-monthly publication beginning with their November/December 2018 issue, featuring country music artist Blake Shelton on the cover. In addition to being the publisher for Cashbox, Wilds & Associates also serves as the distributor of the publication. Since returning to a print edition, a new website was unveiled in late 2021. The new site offers readers a preview of each issue, music news, and subscription information.

Archives
In 2014, Whitburn's Record Research Inc. published a history of the Cash Box singles chart data covering October 1952 through the 1996 demise of the original magazine. Randy Price maintains the original Cash Box data for the online archives.

The Swem Library at The College of William and Mary maintains the archive of the original print editions of Cash Box magazine.

Trivia
The Chicago blues band the Cash Box Kings credit the magazine for their name.

See also
:Category:Cashbox number-one singles

References

External links

 cashboxmagazine.com
 Cashbox Magazine Chart Archives – official site for archived Singles and Albums Charts
 Cash Box Magazine, Inc. – business registry page
 Cash Box – digital archive from College of William & Mary
 Cash Box Magazine – digital archive from WorldRadioHistory
 MusicSeek.info – comparison of Cashbox, Billboard, and other charts

American record charts
Entertainment trade magazines
Defunct magazines published in the United States
Magazines established in 1942
Magazines disestablished in 1996
Online music magazines published in the United States
Online magazines with defunct print editions
Online magazines published in the United States
Weekly magazines published in the United States